Gurratan Singh Aulakh (born 23 September 1953) is an Indian film and television actor, director, writer, producer and sports promoter. He officially started his career with the Punjabi hit 'Mamla Garbar Hai'  opposite Gurdas Maan where he played the main villain. His project ‘Mitter Pyaare nu Haal Mureedan da Kehna’ featured an appearance by Akshay Kumar.

He is the brother-in-law of wrestler and filmmaker Dara Singh.  He continues to appear in films and television. Ratan Aulakh has been honored with Punjab Rafi Ratan Award in 2022 and 'Pride of Punjabi Cinema' award by the Punjabi Screen Club in July 2019.   He also works to bring Hindi Filmmakers to Punjabi cinema.

See also
Jatt James Bond
List of Indian Punjabi films between 2001 and 2010
Main Intequam Loonga

References 

Indian film directors
1953 births
Living people